The Investor Program for Residence and Citizenship in Bulgaria (also known as the Bulgarian Immigrant Investor Program) was founded in 2009 and implemented following the decisive legislation actions of the Bulgarian Government to attract foreign investment and business interest in the country. In return, investors and their families obtain Permanent Residence Permits and become eligible for Bulgarian citizenship.

References

External links 
 http://www.investbulgaria.eu
 https://web.archive.org/web/20110210200216/http://www.agefi.com/2011-02-07/Changements-de-nationalit%C3%A9-pour-simples-raisons-fiscales---288148.php

Immigration to Bulgaria
Immigration to Europe